Lala Lajpat Rai University of Veterinary & Animal Sciences (LUVAS) is a university located in Hisar, Haryana. It is named after the freedom fighter Lala Lajpat Rai.

History 

The College of Veterinary Sciences was shifted to Hisar from Lahore in 1948. It became a part of Chaudhary Charan Singh Haryana Agricultural University in 1971. It has now been established as a university and the college has become a part of the university. The university is currently operating from a temporary campus located at CCS HAU. The Government of Haryana has allotted land on NH 10 for Establishment of new and high tech campus.

Construction of new campus

The 1125 acre campus is constructed at the cost of INR 629 cr, including first phase costing INR 143 cr and second phase of INR 486 cr. As of July 2021, in the Phase-I, which is expected to be completed by December 2021, is 80% complete and it entails constriction of Administrative block and the College of daily science. The Phase-II, Construction of road, sewage treatment plant, boys hostel, girls hostel, 100 houses for staff, etc has commenced, and the Tender for the following have been issued, veterinary college, veterinary hospital, campus hostel for staff and students, campus school, postmortem block, STP, water treatment plant, stud farm, buffalo farm, cow farm, goat farm, sheep farm, pig farm, poultry farm, automatic milking plant, massage parlor for animals.

Academics 
The university currently offers undergraduate and postgraduate, from diploma to doctorate, in Veterinary and Animal science.

Regional Research Centres 

LUVAS has following five Regional Research Centres (RRC) in various stages of planning and operation:
 LUVAS Regional Research Centre, Riwasa (LRRC, Riwasa) at Riwasa, Mahendragarh
 LUVAS Regional Research Centre, Keorak (LRRC, Keorak) at Keorak, Kaithal
 LUVAS Regional Research Centre, Karnal (LRRC, Karnal) at Karnal
 LUVAS Regional Research Centre, Jhajjar (LRRC, Jhajjar)  
 LUVAS Regional Research Centre, Narnaund (LRRC, Narnaund) at Narnaund in Hisar district

See also
 State University of Performing And Visual Arts
 State Institute of Film and Television
 List of Universities and Colleges in Hisar
 List of institutions of higher education in Haryana
 List of think tanks in India

References

External links 
 

Research institutes in Hisar (city)
Universities and colleges in Hisar (city)
Universities in Haryana
Veterinary schools in India
Memorials to Lala Lajpat Rai
Animal husbandry in Haryana
Agricultural universities and colleges in Haryana
2010 establishments in Haryana
Research institutes established in 2010